Labidosauriscus is an extinct genus of anapsid reptile from the Permian period of North America. Fossils have been discovered in Oklahoma.

References 

Permian reptiles of North America
Captorhinids
Cisuralian genus first appearances
Cisuralian genus extinctions
Fossil taxa described in 2018
Prehistoric reptile genera